Sant Miquel (Catalan for Saint Michael) may refer to:

Buildings
Sant Miquel, Benedictine monastery in Cruïlles, Monells i Sant Sadurní de l'Heura, Catalonia, Spain
Sant Miquel del Fai, Benedictine monastery in Bigues i Riells, Catalonia, Spain

Places
Port de Sant Miguel, small beach resort on the north west coast of Ibiza
Sant Miquel de Balansat, village in the Spanish island of Ibiza
Sant Miquel de Campmajor, municipality in the comarca of Pla de l'Estany
Sant Miquel de Fluvià, municipality in the comarca of Alt Empordà
Sant Miquel de Solterra, highest mountain of the Guilleries Massif, Catalonia, Spain

See also
Miquel (disambiguation)